Élisabeth Chaud (born 7 December 1960 in Puy-Saint-Vincent, Hautes-Alpes, France) is a retired French alpine skier who competed in the 1984 Winter Olympics.

References 
 

1960 births
Living people
French female alpine skiers
Olympic alpine skiers of France
Alpine skiers at the 1984 Winter Olympics
Sportspeople from Hautes-Alpes